Brad Pemberton (born August 8, 1969) is an American drummer, primarily known for his role in several bands backing Ryan Adams, including The Sweetheart Revolution, The Damn Band, The Pinkhearts and The Cardinals. Pemberton previously played in Iodine (with Cardinals bassist Chris Feinstein). He has also toured with Brendan Benson.  In February 2016 Brad Pemberton was announced as the new drummer with Steve Earle and The Dukes.

Discography

References

1969 births
Living people
The Cardinals (rock band) members
20th-century American drummers
American male drummers
20th-century American male musicians